The 2019–20 San Antonio Spurs season was the 53rd season of the franchise, its 44th in the National Basketball Association (NBA), and its 47th in the San Antonio area. For the first time since the 1996–97 season, the Spurs failed to qualify for the postseason when the Memphis Grizzlies defeated the Milwaukee Bucks on August 13, 2020, snapping their 22-year consecutive playoff streak and finishing with a losing record. This was only the second time under Gregg Popovich's tenure that the Spurs failed to make the playoffs. After their 22-year playoff streak was snapped, the Pittsburgh Penguins of the National Hockey League now own the longest active playoff streak in any major North American sports league making the playoffs every year since 2006–07. The Houston Rockets held the longest active playoff streak in the NBA, making the playoffs every year from 2012–13 to 2020–21.

The season was suspended by the league officials following the games of March 11 after it was reported that Rudy Gobert tested positive for COVID-19.

On June 4, the Spurs were one of 22 teams invited to the NBA Bubble.

Season synopsis
Before the season, Ettore Messina left the Spurs' coaching staff. The staff was joined by onetime Spurs superstar Tim Duncan.

The Spurs retired the number nine jersey of onetime Spurs point guard Tony Parker at the AT&T Center on November 10, 2019 prior to a home game against the Memphis Grizzlies.

From November 9–20, 2019, the Spurs suffered their first seven-game losing streak since 1996–97. (The 1996–97 season was Gregg Popovich's first year as Spurs head coach, is the most recent season in which the Spurs finished with a losing record, and is the most recent season in which the Spurs failed to make the NBA playoffs.)

Draft

The Spurs held two first-round draft picks in the 2019 draft, including the 29th pick they obtained from Toronto in the Kawhi Leonard-DeMar DeRozan trade in 2018. They also held a second-round draft pick.

Roster

Standings

Division

Conference

Game log

Preseason
The entire preseason schedule was released on July 22, 2019.

|- style="background:#fcc;"
| 1
| October 5
| Orlando
| 
| Bryn Forbes (24)
| Rudy Gay (6)
| Derrick White (6)
| AT&T Center14,123
| 0–1
|- style="background:#fcc;"
| 2
| October 8
| @ Miami
| 
| Rudy Gay (12)
| Jakob Pöltl (5)
| Murray, DeRozan (3)
| AmericanAirlines Arena19,600
| 0–2
|- style="background:#fcc;"
| 3
| October 13
| New Orleans
| 
| Bryn Forbes (18)
| Jakob Pöltl (7)
| Patty Mills (6)
| AT&T Center12,101
| 0–3
|- style="background:#cfc;"
| 4
| October 16
| @ Houston
| 
| LaMarcus Aldridge (22)
| DeMarre Carroll (7)
| Jakob Pöltl (5)
| Toyota Center17,283
| 1–3
|- style="background:#cfc;"
| 5
| October 18
| Memphis
| 
| Patty Mills (16)
| LaMarcus Aldridge (11)
| DeMar DeRozan (5)
| AT&T Center12,664
| 2–3

Regular season 

|- style="background:#cfc;"
| 1
| October 23
| New York
| 
| LaMarcus Aldridge (22)
| Trey Lyles (11)
| Dejounte Murray (6)
| AT&T Center18,354
| 1–0
|- style="background:#cfc;"
| 2
| October 26
| Washington
| 
| LaMarcus Aldridge (27)
| Dejounte Murray (10)
| Poeltl, Murray (4)
| AT&T Center18,354
| 2–0
|- style="background:#cfc;"
| 3
| October 28
| Portland
| 
| DeMar DeRozan (27)
| Trey Lyles (8)
| Dejounte Murray (8)
| AT&T Center18,083
| 3–0
|- style="background:#fcc;"
| 4
| October 31
| @ L. A. Clippers
| 
| DeMar DeRozan (29)
| Rudy Gay (12)
| Rudy Gay (4)
| Staples Center19,068
| 3–1

|- style="background:#cfc;"
| 5
| November 1
| @ Golden State
| 
| Patty Mills (31)
| Trey Lyles (14)
| DeMar DeRozan (11)
| Chase Center18,064
| 4–1
|- style="background:#fcc;"
| 6
| November 3
| L. A. Lakers
| 
| Dejounte Murray (18)
| Dejounte Murray (11)
| DeMar DeRozan (5)
| AT&T Center18,610
| 4–2
|- style="background:#fcc;"
| 7
| November 5
| @ Atlanta
| 
| DeMar DeRozan (22)
| Trey Lyles (12)
| Aldridge, DeRozan, Murray (4)
| State Farm Arena14,025
| 4–3
|- style="background:#cfc;"
| 8
| November 7
| Oklahoma City
| 
| LaMarcus Aldridge (39)
| Dejounte Murray (8)
| Dejounte Murray (10)
| AT&T Center18,354
| 5–3
|- style="background:#fcc;"
| 9
| November 9
| Boston
| 
| DeMar DeRozan (22)
| Lyles, Metu (8)
| DeRozan, Murray (4)
| AT&T Center18,354
| 5–4
|- style="background:#fcc;"
| 10
| November 11
| Memphis
| 
| LaMarcus Aldridge (19)
| Rudy Gay (8)
| DeMar DeRozan (7)
| AT&T Center18,627
| 5–5
|- style="background:#fcc;"
| 11
| November 13
| @ Minnesota
| 
| DeMar DeRozan (27)
| Trey Lyles (11)
| DeRozan, White (4)
| Target Center11,581
| 5–6
|- style="background:#fcc;"
| 12
| November 15
| @ Orlando
| 
| DeMar DeRozan (21)
| Trey Lyles (12)
| Dejounte Murray (6)
| Amway Center16,296
| 5–7
|- style="background:#fcc;"
| 13
| November 16
| Portland
| 
| LaMarcus Aldridge (30)
| LaMarcus Aldridge (13)
| DeRozan, White, Mills (5)
| AT&T Center18,534
| 5–8
|- style="background:#fcc;"
| 14
| November 18
| @ Dallas
| 
| DeMar DeRozan (36)
| Jakob Poeltl (10)
| DeMar DeRozan (4)
| American Airlines Center19,637
| 5–9
|- style="background:#fcc;"
| 15
| November 20
| @ Washington
| 
| DeMar DeRozan (31)
| LaMarcus Aldridge (10)
| Bryn Forbes (7)
| Capital One Arena14,579
| 5–10
|- style="background:#fcc;"
| 16
| November 22
| @ Philadelphia
| 
| DeMar DeRozan (29)
| DeMar DeRozan (7)
| Mills, Murray (4)
| Wells Fargo Center20,927
| 5–11
|- style="background:#cfc;"
| 17
| November 23
| @ New York
| 
| LaMarcus Aldridge (23)
| Jakob Poeltl (10)
| Derrick White (5)
| Madison Square Garden19,320
| 6–11
|- style="background:#fcc;"
| 18
| November 25
| L. A. Lakers
| 
| LaMarcus Aldridge (30)
| Poeltl, Murray (8)
| DeRozan, Forbes (5)
| AT&T Center18,498
| 6–12
|- style="background:#fcc;"
| 19
| November 27
| Minnesota
| 
| LaMarcus Aldridge (22)
| Rudy Gay (11)
| Derrick White (6)
| AT&T Center18,354
| 6–13
|- style="background:#cfc;"
| 20
| November 29
| L. A. Clippers
| 
| White, Aldridge (17)
| DeMar DeRozan (9)
| LaMarcus Aldridge (7)
| AT&T Center18,354
| 7–13

|- style="background:#fcc;"
| 21
| December 1
| @ Detroit
| 
| DeMar DeRozan (20)
| Drew Eubanks (8)
| Dejounte Murray (6)
| Little Caesars Arena14,270
| 7–14
|- style="background:#cfc;"
| 22
| December 3
| Houston
| 
| Lonnie Walker (28)
| Jakob Poeltl (15)
| DeMar DeRozan (9)
| AT&T Center18,354
| 8–14
|- style="background:#cfc;"
| 23
| December 6
| Sacramento
| 
| LaMarcus Aldridge (19)
| LaMarcus Aldridge (13)
| DeMar DeRozan (7)
| AT&T Center18,354
| 9–14
|- style="background:#fcc;"
| 24
| December 12
| Cleveland
| 
| DeMar DeRozan (21)
| LaMarcus Aldridge (10)
| DeRozan, Murray (4)
| AT&T Center18,354
| 9–15
|- style="background:#cfc;"
| 25
| December 14
| @ Phoenix
| 
| Patty Mills (26)
| Jakob Poeltl (11)
| Dejounte Murray (5)
| Mexico City Arena20,013
| 10–15
|- style="background:#fcc;"
| 26
| December 16
| @ Houston
| 
| LaMarcus Aldridge (19)
| LaMarcus Aldridge (13)
| DeMar DeRozan (5)
| Toyota Center18,055
| 10–16
|- style="background:#cfc;"
| 27
| December 19
| Brooklyn
| 
| Patty Mills (27)
| LaMarcus Aldridge (10)
| DeMar DeRozan (6)
| AT&T Center18,354
| 11–16
|- style="background:#fcc;"
| 28
| December 21
| L. A. Clippers
| 
| DeMar DeRozan (24)
| Gay, Murray, Poeltl (5)
| Dejounte Murray (6)
| AT&T Center18,354
| 11–17
|- style="background:#cfc;"
| 29
| December 23
| @ Memphis
| 
| LaMarcus Aldridge (40)
| LaMarcus Aldridge (9)
| DeMar DeRozan (10)
| FedExForum16,776
| 12–17
|- style="background:#fcc;"
| 30
| December 26
| @ Dallas
| 
| DeMar DeRozan (21)
| Rudy Gay (8)
| Derrick White (6)
| American Airlines Center20,427
| 12–18
|- style="background:#cfc;"
| 31
| December 28
| Detroit
| 
| DeMar DeRozan (29)
| LaMarcus Aldridge (12)
| DeMar DeRozan (8)
| AT&T Center18,524
| 13–18
|- style="background:#cfc;"
| 32
| December 31
| Golden State
| 
| DeMar DeRozan (24)
| LaMarcus Aldridge (12)
| Dejounte Murray (5)
| AT&T Center18,354
| 14–18

|- style="background:#fcc;"
| 33
| January 2
| Oklahoma City
| 
| DeMar DeRozan (30)
| LaMarcus Aldridge (11)
| Derrick White (5)
| AT&T Center18,354
| 14–19
|- style="background:#fcc;"
| 34
| January 4
| @ Milwaukee
| 
| DeMar DeRozan (26)
| Trey Lyles (14)
| DeMar DeRozan (5)
| Fiserv Forum18,002
| 14–20
|- style="background:#cfc;"
| 35
| January 6
| Milwaukee
| 
| DeMar DeRozan (25)
| Trey Lyles (12)
| DeMar DeRozan (7)
| AT&T Center18,354
| 15–20
|- style="background:#cfc;"
| 36
| January 8
| @ Boston
| 
| DeMar DeRozan (30)
| Jakob Poeltl (8)
| Bryn Forbes (6)
| TD Garden19,156
| 16–20
|- style="background:#fcc;"
| 37
| January 10
| @ Memphis
| 
| DeMar DeRozan (36)
| Aldridge, DeRozan  (9)
| DeMar DeRozan (9)
| FedExForum16,448
| 16–21
|- style="background:#cfc;"
| 38
| January 12
| @ Toronto
| 
| DeMar DeRozan (25)
| Jakob Poeltl (10)
| Aldridge, DeRozan, White, Murray  (4)
| Scotiabank Arena19,800
| 17–21
|- style="background:#fcc;"
| 39
| January 15
| @ Miami
| 
| DeMar DeRozan (30)
| Lyles, Murray  (7)
| DeMar DeRozan (7)
| American Airlines Arena19,704
| 17–22
|- style="background:#fcc;"
| 40
| January 17
| Atlanta
| 
| LaMarcus Aldridge (30)
| Dejounte Murray (12)
| DeMar DeRozan (9)
| AT&T Center18,354
| 17–23
|- style="background:#cfc;"
| 41
| January 19
| Miami
| 
| LaMarcus Aldridge (21)
| DeMar DeRozan (9)
| DeMar DeRozan (9)
| AT&T Center18,422
| 18–23
|- style="background:#cfc;"
| 42
| January 20
| @ Phoenix
| 
| Derrick White (25)
| DeMar DeRozan (9)
| DeMar DeRozan (8)
| Talking Stick Resort Arena14,847
| 19–23
|- style="background:#cfc;"
| 43
| January 22
| @ New Orleans
| 
| LaMarcus Aldridge (32)
| LaMarcus Aldridge (14)
| Derrick White (7)
| Smoothie King Center18,365
| 20–23
|- style="background:#fcc;"
| 44
| January 24
| Phoenix
| 
| DeMar DeRozan (30)
| DeRozan, Lyles (8)
| DeRozan, White (4)
| AT&T Center18,354
| 20–24
|- style="background:#fcc;"
| 45
| January 26
| Toronto
| 
| DeRozan, White (14)
| LaMarcus Aldridge (10)
| DeMar DeRozan (7)
| AT&T Center18,354
| 20–25
|- style="background:#fcc;"
| 46
| January 27
| @ Chicago
| 
| DeMar DeRozan (36)
| Jakob Poeltl (13)
| Bryn Forbes (5)
| United Center16,071
| 20–26
|- style="background:#cfc;"
| 47
| January 29
| Utah
| 
| DeMar DeRozan (38)
| Jakob Poeltl (8)
| DeRozan, Poeltl (5)
| AT&T Center18,778
| 21–26

|- style="background:#cfc;"
| 48
| February 1
| Charlotte
| 
| DeMar DeRozan (24)
| Dejounte Murray (10)
| DeMar DeRozan (6)
| AT&T Center18,615
| 22–26
|- style="background:#fcc;"
| 49
| February 3
| @ L. A. Clippers
| 
| LaMarcus Aldridge (27)
| LaMarcus Aldridge (9)
| Derrick White (6)
| Staples Center19,068
| 22–27
|- style="background:#fcc;"
| 50
| February 4
| @ L. A. Lakers
| 
| DeMar DeRozan (28)
| DeMar DeRozan (9)
| DeMar DeRozan (7)
| Staples Center18,997
| 22–28
|- style="background:#fcc;"
| 51
| February 6
| @ Portland
| 
| Trey Lyles (23)
| Trey Lyles (10)
| DeMar DeRozan (6)
| Moda Center19,653
| 22–29
|- style="background:#fcc;"
| 52
| February 8
| @ Sacramento
| 
| Dejounte Murray (17)
| LaMarcus Aldridge (10)
| Dejounte Murray (9)
| Golden 1 Center16,756
| 22–30
|- style="background:#fcc;"
| 53
| February 10
| @ Denver
| 
| LaMarcus Aldridge (33)
| Trey Lyles (7)
| Dejounte Murray (9)
| Pepsi Center19,520
| 22–31
|- style="background:#cfc;"
| 54
| February 11
| @ Oklahoma City
| 
| Aldridge, Murray (25)
| LaMarcus Aldridge (14)
| Derrick White (8)
| Chesapeake Energy Arena18,203
| 23–31
|- style="background:#cfc;"
| 55
| February 21
| @ Utah
| 
| Dejounte Murray (23)
| LaMarcus Aldridge (8)
| DeMar DeRozan (7)
| Vivint Smart Home Arena18,306
| 24–31
|- style="background:#fcc;"
| 56
| February 23
| @ Oklahoma City
| 
| Rudy Gay (14)
| Rudy Gay (6)
| Dejounte Murray (7)
| Chesapeake Energy Arena18,203
| 24–32
|- style="background:#fcc;"
| 57
| February 26
| Dallas
| 
| DeMar DeRozan (27)
| Trey Lyles (9)
| DeMar DeRozan (9)
| AT&T Center18,354
| 24–33
|- style="background:#cfc;"
| 58
| February 29
| Orlando
| 
| Trey Lyles (20)
| Trey Lyles (9)
| DeMar DeRozan (9)
| AT&T Center18,354
| 25–33

|- style="background:#fcc;"
| 59
| March 2
| Indiana
| 
| Patty Mills (24)
| Dejounte Murray (7)
| DeMar DeRozan (7)
| AT&T Center17,635
| 25–34
|- style="background:#cfc;"
| 60
| March 3
| @ Charlotte
| 
| Dejounte Murray (21)
| Rudy Gay (7)
| DeMar DeRozan (10)
| Spectrum Center12,008
| 26–34
|- style="background:#fcc;"
| 61
| March 6
| @ Brooklyn
| 
| DeMar DeRozan (24)
| Gay, Murray (6)
| DeMar DeRozan (9)
| Barclays Center16,277
| 26–35
|- style="background:#fcc;"
| 62
| March 8
| @ Cleveland
| 
| DeMar DeRozan (25)
| Gay, Lyles (9)
| Dejounte Murray (6)
| Rocket Mortgage FieldHouse17,995
| 26–36
|- style="background:#cfc;"
| 63
| March 10
| Dallas
| 
| LaMarcus Aldridge (24)
| Trey Lyles (11)
| DeMar DeRozan (12)
| AT&T Center18,354
| 27–36

|- style="background:#cfc;"
| 64
| July 31
| Sacramento
| 
| DeMar DeRozan (27)
| Gay, White (8)
| DeMar DeRozan (10)
| Visa Athletic CenterNo In-Person Attendance
| 28–36
|- style="background:#cfc;"
| 65
| August 2
| @ Memphis
| 
| Dejounte Murray (21)
| Dejounte Murray (10)
| DeRozan, White (7)
| Visa Athletic CenterNo In-Person Attendance
| 29–36
|- style="background:#fcc;"
| 66
| August 3
| @ Philadelphia
| 
| DeMar DeRozan (30)
| Drew Eubanks (10)
| Jakob Pöltl (4)
| Visa Athletic CenterNo In-Person Attendance
| 29–37
|- style="background:#fcc;"
| 67
| August 5
| Denver
| 
| Rudy Gay (24)
| Jakob Pöltl (7)
| DeMar DeRozan (8)
| Visa Athletic CenterNo In-Person Attendance
| 29–38
|- style="background:#cfc;"
| 68
| August 7
| Utah
| 
| Derrick White (24)
| Jakob Pöltl (10)
| Dejounte Murray (6)
| HP Field HouseNo In-Person Attendance
| 30–38
|- style="background:#cfc;"
| 69
| August 9
| @ New Orleans
| 
| DeMar DeRozan (27)
| Jakob Pöltl (14)
| Lonnie Walker (4)
| HP Field HouseNo In-Person Attendance
| 31–38
|- style="background:#cfc;"
| 70
| August 11
| Houston
| 
| Keldon Johnson (24)
| Jakob Pöltl (12)
| Dejounte Murray (7)
| HP Field HouseNo In-Person Attendance
| 32–38
|- style="background:#fcc;"
| 71
| August 13
| @ Utah
| 
| Keldon Johnson (20)
| Dejounte Murray (14)
| Dejounte Murray (7)
| HP Field HouseNo In-Person Attendance
| 32–39

|- style="background:#;"
| 64
| March 13
| Denver
| 
| 
| 
| 
| AT&T Center
| 
|- style="background:#;"
| 65
| March 14
| Minnesota
| 
| 
| 
| 
| AT&T Center
| 
|- style="background:#;"
| 66
| March 16
| Memphis
| 
| 
| 
| 
| AT&T Center
| 
|- style="background:#;"
| 67
| March 18
| @ New Orleans
| 
| 
| 
| 
| Smoothie King Center
| 
|- style="background:#;"
| 68
| March 20
| Chicago
| 
| 
| 
| 
| AT&T Center
| 
|- style="background:#;"
| 69
| March 22
| Utah
| 
| 
| 
| 
| AT&T Center
| 
|- style="background:#;"
| 70
| March 24
| @ Utah
| 
| 
| 
| 
| Vivint Smart Home Arena
| 
|- style="background:#;"
| 71
| March 26
| @ Minnesota
| 
| 
| 
| 
| Target Center
| 
|- style="background:#;"
| 72
| March 27
| @ Denver
| 
| 
| 
| 
| Pepsi Center
| 
|- style="background:#;"
| 73
| March 29
| @ Golden State
| 
| 
| 
| 
| Chase Center
| 
|- style="background:#;"
| 74
| March 31
| @ Sacramento
| 
| 
| 
| 
| Golden 1 Center
| 
|- style="background:#;"
| 75
| April 3
| Golden State
| 
| 
| 
| 
| AT&T Center
| 
|- style="background:#;"
| 76
| April 5
| New Orleans
| 
| 
| 
| 
| AT&T Center
| 
|- style="background:#;"
| 77
| April 7
| Sacramento
| 
| 
| 
| 
| AT&T Center
| 
|- style="background:#;"
| 78
| April 8
| @ Houston
| 
| 
| 
| 
| Toyota Center
| 
|- style="background:#;"
| 79
| April 10
| Philadelphia
| 
| 
| 
| 
| AT&T Center
| 
|- style="background:#;"
| 80
| April 12
| Houston
| 
| 
| 
| 
| AT&T Center
| 
|- style="background:#;"
| 81
| April 13
| @ Indiana
| 
| 
| 
| 
| Bankers Life Fieldhouse
| 
|- style="background:#;"
| 82
| April 15
| New Orleans
| 
| 
| 
| 
| AT&T Center
|

Transactions

Free agency

Re-signed

Additions

Subtractions

References

San Antonio Spurs seasons
San Antonio Spurs
San Antonio Spurs
San Antonio Spurs